Huai Thap Than railway station is a railway station located in Huai Thap Than Subdistrict, Huai Thap Than District, Sisaket Province.

References 

Railway stations in Thailand
Sisaket province